Circe, the Enchantress is a 1924 American silent drama film directed by Robert Z. Leonard. The film starred Leonard's then-wife Mae Murray. This was their last collaboration, and they divorced soon after. Considered to be a lost film for decades, a print of Circe, the Enchantress was found at a foreign archive.

Plot
Cecilie Brunner (Murray) was once a good natured woman. After the death of her mother, she becomes a cynical vamp. She falls in love with surgeon Peter Van Martyn (James Kirkwood, Sr.). Peter makes clear he does not approve her life style. This results in Cecilie even partying more. She ends up gambling her home away.

Realizing her life style isn't appropriate, Cecilie changes back into a sweet woman. However, she is paralyzed after being hit by a car, while saving a child. It is Peter who heals her.

Cast
 Mae Murray - Circe (mythical goddess)/Cecilie Brunne
 James Kirkwood, Sr. - Dr. Peter Van Martyn
 Tom Ricketts - Archibald Crumm
 Charles K. Gerrard - Ballard 'Bal' Barrett
 William Haines - William Craig
 Lillian Langdon - Sister Agatha
 Gene Cameron - 'Madame' Ducelle (modiste)

References

External links
 
 
 Theatrical advertisement for the film
 Newspaper advertisement, line drawing at Flickr

1924 films
1924 drama films
Silent American drama films
American silent feature films
American black-and-white films
Films directed by Robert Z. Leonard
1920s rediscovered films
Metro-Goldwyn-Mayer films
Tiffany Pictures films
Rediscovered American films
1920s American films